The women's road race at the 2014 World University Cycling Championship took place in Jelenia Góra, Poland on 10 July 2014. The race was 66 km long. 32 riders from 12 countries registered for the race. One rider did not start and two riders did not finish.

After finishing second in the time trial the day before, Kathrin Hammes won the road race. Katarzyna Solus-Miśkowicz finished second and time trial winner Martyna Klekot took bronze.

Top-10 final classification

Source

References

External links
International University Sports Federation - Cycling

World University Cycling Championships
World University Cycling Championship
Cycling